The Delray Beach Open is an ATP World Tour 250 series men's professional tennis tournament held each year in Delray Beach, Florida, United States. Played on hard courts, it was previously known as America's Red Clay Championships, Citrix Tennis Championships,  and the Delray Beach International Tennis Championships. The event was held in Coral Springs from 1993 to 1998; in 1999, it was relocated to the Delray Beach Tennis Center. American Todd Martin won the tournament's first singles event in 1993.

The tournament was previously named the Delray Beach International Tennis Championships (ITC) before being changed to its current name in 2014.

Past finals

Singles

Doubles

See also
List of tennis tournaments

Notes

References

External links
 
 ATP tournament profile

 
1993 establishments in Florida
ATP Tour
Hard court tennis tournaments in the United States
Recurring sporting events established in 1993